#GirlsSpkOut is the second Japanese extended play and the sixth overall by South Korean singer Taeyeon. It was released digitally on October 30, 2020, by SM Entertainment Japan, and physically on November 18 by Universal Music Japan sublabel EMI Records.

Background and release 
On September 11, 2020, it was announced that Taeyeon would release her second Japanese EP in November. The album includes the title track "#GirlsSpkOut" for a total of five tracks. It was released in four editions: First limited edition (CD+DVD/photobook); first limited edition with limited edition goods (CD+DVD/photobook/goods); regular edition with limited edition goods (CD/goods) and the normal CD.

The music video for "#GirlsSpkOut" was released on October 1, 2020, and the EP was released digitally on October 30, 2020.

Track listing

Charts

Release history

References 

2020 EPs
Taeyeon EPs
Japanese-language EPs
EMI Records EPs